Ingeborg Mstislavna of Kiev (fl. 1137) was a Ruthenian princess, married to the Danish prince Canute Lavard of Jutland.

She was the daughter of Grand Prince Mstislav I of Kiev and Christina Ingesdotter of Sweden and was in about 1116 married to Canute in a marriage arranged by her maternal aunt, the Danish queen Margaret Fredkulla. In 1130, she tried to prevent Canute from going to the gathering where he was to be murdered, but without success. She gave birth to their son, Valdemar I of Denmark, posthumously in January 1131. In 1137, she refused to support the suggestion of Christiern Svendsen to proclaim her son monarch after the death of Erik Emune. Ingeborg is not mentioned after this, and the date of her birth and death are unknown.

Issue
 Margaret of Denmark; married Stig Hvitaledr
 Christine of Denmark (b. 1118); married (1133) Magnus IV of Norway
 Catherine of Denmark; married Pribislav Henry, Duke of Mecklenburg
 Valdemar I of Denmark (born 1131)

References
 Ingeborg i Carl Frederik Bricka, Dansk biografisk Lexikon (första utgåvan, 1894)

12th-century Rus' women
Danish princesses
12th-century Danish women
Kievan Rus' princesses
12th-century Danish people
Rurik dynasty
House of Estridsen
12th-century Rus' people